The Chlorophyceae are one of the classes of green algae, distinguished mainly on the basis of ultrastructural morphology.  They are usually green due to the dominance of pigments chlorophyll a and chlorophyll b. The chloroplast may be discoid, plate-like, reticulate, cup-shaped, spiral or ribbon shaped in different species. Most of the members have one or more storage bodies called pyrenoids located in the chloroplast. Pyrenoids contain protein besides starch. Some green algae may store food in the form of oil droplets. They usually have a cell wall made up of an inner layer of cellulose and outer layer of pectose.

General characteristics

 the body may be unicellular, colonial, filamentous or multicellular.
 They are usually green due to the presence of chlorophyll a, chlorophyll b and beta-carotene.
 The chloroplast may be discoid, cup-shaped (e.g. Chlamydomonas), spiral or ribbon shaped
 Most chlorophytes have one or more storage bodies called pyrenoids (central proteinaceous body covered with a starch sheath) that are localised around the chloroplast.
 The inner cell wall layer is made of cellulose and the outer layer of pectose.
 Asexual reproduction is by zoospores. They are flagellates produced from the parent cells by mitosis. Also by aplanospores, hypnospores, akinetes, Palmella stage, etc.
 Sexual reproduction of Chlorophyceae is isogamous, anisogamous or oogamous.
 The chlorophycean CW clade, and chlorophycean DO clade, are defined by the arrangement of their flagella. Members of the CW clade have flagella that are displaced in a "clockwise" (CW, 1–7 o'clock) direction e.g. Chlamydomonadales.  Members of the DO clade have flagella that are "directly opposed" (DO, 12–6 o'clock) e.g. Sphaeropleales.

Reproduction

Vegetative reproduction usually takes place by fragmentation. Asexual reproduction is by flagellated zoospores. And haplospore, perennation (akinate and palmella stage). Asexual reproduction by mitospore absent in spyrogyra.
Sexual reproduction shows considerable variation in the type and formation of sex cells and it may be isogamous e.g. Chlamydomonas, Ulothrix, anisogamous e.g. Chlamydomonas, Eudorina or Oogamous e.g. Chlamydomonas, Volvox. Chlamydomonas has all three types of sexual reproduction.
 
They share many similarities with the higher plants, including the presence of asymmetrical flagellated cells, the breakdown of the nuclear envelope at mitosis, and the presence of phytochromes, flavonoids, and the chemical precursors to the cuticle.

The sole method of reproduction in Chlorella is asexual and azoosporic. The content of the cell divides into 2,4 (B), 8(C) sometimes daughter protoplasts. Each daughter protoplast rounds off to form a non-motile spore. These autospores (spores having the same distinctive shape as the parent cell) are liberated by the rupture of the parent cell wall (D). On release each autospore grows to become a new individual. The presence of sulphur in the culture medium is considered essential for cell division. It takes place even in the dark with sulphur alone as the source material but under light conditions nitrogen also required in addition. Pearsal and Loose (1937) reported the occurrence of motile cells in Chlorella. Bendix (1964) also observed that Chlorella produces motile cells which might be gametes. These observations have an important bearing on the concept of the life cycle of Chlorella, which at present is considered to be strictly asexual in character.

Asexual reproduction in Chlorella ellipsoides has been studied in detail and the following four phases have been observed during the asexual reproduction.

(i) Growth Phase - During this phase the cells grow in size by utilizing the photosynthetic products.

(ii) Ripening phase - In this phase the cells mature and prepare themselves for division.

(iii) Post ripening phase - During this phase, each mature cell divides twice either in dark or in light. The cells formed in dark are known as dark to light phase, cells again grow in size.

(iv) Division Phase - During this phase the parent cell wall ruptures and unicells are released.

Orders
, AlgaeBase accepted the following orders in the class Chlorophyceae:
Chaetopeltidales C.J.O'Kelly, Shin Watanabe, & G.L.Floyd – 15 species
Chaetophorales Wille – 216 species
Chlamydomonadales F.E.Fritsch – 1752 species
Oedogoniales Heering – 733 species
Palaeosiphonocladales  – 2 species
Sphaeropleales Luerssen – 909 species

Other orders that have been recognized include:
 Dunaliellales – Dunaliella and Dunaliellaceae are placed in Chlamydomonadales by AlgaeBase
 Chlorococcales – Chlorococcum and Chlorococcaceae are placed in Chlamydomonadales by AlgaeBase
 Microsporales – Microspora and Microsporaceae are placed in Sphaeropleales by AlgaeBase
 Tetrasporales – Tetraspora and Tetrasporaceae are placed in Chlamydomonadales by AlgaeBase

In older classifications, the term Chlorophyceae is sometimes used to apply to all the green algae except the Charales, and the internal division is considerably different.

See also
 Cladistics
 List of Chlorophyceae genera

References

External links
 AlgaeBase

 
Green algae classes